was a Japanese hard rock/power metal band formed by Takenori Shimoyama (Sixride, ex-Saber Tiger) and Norifumi Shima (Concerto Moon) in 2000. They toured France in the same year as an opening act of Symphony X. Their activity was suspended intermittently, and indefinitely stopped in July 2007.

Band members

Current members
 Takenori Shimoyama - Vocals
 Norifumi Shima - Guitar
 Toshiyuki Koike - Keyboard
 Takanobu Kimoto - Bass
 Yoshio Isoda - Drums

Former members
Kosaku Mitani - Bass

Discography

Albums

 Double Dealer (2000)
 Deride At The Top (2001)
 Fate & Destiny (2005)
 Desert Of Lost Souls (2007)

Live albums
 Fate & Destiny Tour 2005 Live In Osaka (2006)

DVD releases
 Fate & Destiny Tour 2005 Live In Tokyo (2006)

External links 
The Official Double Dealer Website

Japanese power metal musical groups
Japanese hard rock musical groups